Another Course to College (ACC) is a Public Pilot School located in Hyde Park, Boston, Massachusetts, United States.

History
In 1976 the Peter Faneuil School, located in Boston's Beacon Hill neighborhood, changed use and housed a joint transitional studies program of the Boston Public Schools and the University of Massachusetts named Another Course To College, commonly known by the acronym ACC. The program provided two years of traditional and intensive college preparatory work covering a student's junior and senior years, designed to provide students with an option to the curriculum, instructional style and organizational structure present within the regular school program. Admission was based on GPA, IQ based entrance exam, and/or teacher recommendation. Students entered the program through their assigned (home) school's "flexible campus program" and maintained enrollment there, receiving their diploma from the home school upon graduation. ACC students received UMASS I.D. cards, and were official members of the UMASS-Boston student body. Courses taken by the students at UMASS received high school and college credits.
After its first year, 86 of 88 seniors who applied for college admission were accepted.

After the ACC/UMASS program funding was cut the building closed and converted into apartments. In its first of many moves, ACC held classes in the basement of Hyde Park High School in Hyde Park, Boston starting in the 1989–1990 school year. The Peter Faneuil School was added to the National Register of Historic Places on December 16, 1994.

ACC was approved as a Boston pilot school in June, 2003. In that year, ACC added 9th grade and transitioned from being an alternative program to a four-year pilot high school. The 2004–2005 school year marked ACC's first year as a full high school enrolling students in grades 9–12.

Heads of School
 John M. Regan (1976–1980)
 John F. Best (1980–1987)
 Curtis D. Wells (1987–1990)
 Marilyn Hurwitz (1990–1995)
 Marilyn Corsini (1995–2001)
 Gerald Howland (2001–2007)
 Rachel Skerritt (2007–2009)
 Lisa Gilbert-Smith (2009–2015)
 Michele Pellam (2015–present)

Locations
 60 Joy Street, Beacon Hill (1976–1989)
 655 Metropolitan Avenue, Hyde Park (1989–1993)
 320 Newbury Street, Boston (1993–1998)  
 989 Commonwealth Avenue, Boston (1998–2004)
 20 Warren Street, Brighton (2004–2016)
 612 Metropolitan Avenue, Hyde Park (2016–present)

References

External links
 

High schools in Boston
Educational institutions established in 1976
Public high schools in Massachusetts
1976 establishments in Massachusetts
Beacon Hill, Boston
Hyde Park, Boston